The Kingdom of Thailand, recognized by the name of Thailand by the International Olympic Committee (IOC), represented by the National Olympic Committee of Thailand (NOCT), competed at the 2018 Summer Youth Olympics in Buenos Aires, Argentina, from October 6 to 18, 2018.

The National Olympic Committee of Thailand fielded a team of 57 athletes, 25 boys and 32 girls, to compete in 21 sports at the Games. It was the nation's largest ever delegation sent to the Youth Olympics. Thailand roster marked its Olympic debut in boxing, BMX cycling, canoeing, handball (beach handball), football (futsal), karate (new to the 2018 Games), and roller speed skating (new to the 2018 Games).
Moreover, Thailand delegations led by Prof.Dr. Varin Tansuphasiri, is scheduled to observe the 2018 games to bid the 2026 Youth Olympics with the city of Bangkok, Chonburi, Chiang Mai or Phuket.

Medal summary

Medals by sport

Medals by day

Medalists 

The following Thailand competitors won medals at the Games.

Supatchanin Khamhaeng was disqualified after testing positive for a banned substance. She was stripped of her gold medal.

Competitors

Delegations
Team Thailand
Thana Chaiprasit – Chef de Mission
26 Officials and staffs
3 Referees
Varitta Srijunvong – Thai Youth Olympic Ambassador
National Olympic Committee of Thailand
Khunying Patama Leeswadtrakul – IOC Member
Prof.Dr. Varin Tansuphasiri – Chief of Thailand Youth Olympics Bid Committee
The Wild Boar Football Club
The IOC invited the Wild Boar Football Club who trapped in Tham Luang Nang Non cave to participate in the 2018 Youth Olympics.

Athletics

Archery

Aitthiwat Soithong qualified based on his performance (third place) at the Asian Continental Qualification Tournament in Dhaka, Bangladesh.

Individual

Team

Badminton

Thailand qualified two players based on the Badminton Junior World Rankings.

Singles

Team

Beach handball

Both boys' and girls' team qualified based on his performance (best Asian team) at the 2017 Youth Beach Handball World Championship in Mauritius. However, due to the rules of the Games only allowing the National Olympic Committees (NOCs) to enter one team sport (futsal, beach handball, field hockey, or rugby sevens) per gender, the event of their participation has not yet been made official.

Summary

Summary

Men's tournament
Preliminary round

Beach volleyball

Phanupong Thanan and Phichakon Narathon, also Thatsarida Singchuea and Pawarun Chanthawichai qualified on their performance (boys' runners up and girls champions) at the 2018 Asian U19 Beach Volleyball Championships in Nakhon Pathom, Thailand.

Boxing

Sarawut Sukthet, Atichai Phoemsap, Weerapon Jongjohor, and Porntip Buapa qualified on their performance (Asian champions) at the 2018 Youth Asian Confederation Boxing Championships in Bangkok, Thailand.

Boys

Girls

Canoeing

Pornnapphan Phuangmaiming qualified based on her performance (best world ranking) at the World Qualification Tournament in Barcelona, Spain.

Girls

Cycling

Kometh Sookprasert and Panadda Booranawong qualified were given two quotas to compete based on its ranking in the Youth Olympic Games BMX Junior Nation Rankings.

Futsal

Summary

Group C

Golf

Individual

Team

Karate

Thailand qualified one athlete based on its performance at one of the Karate Qualification Tournaments.

Roller speed skating

Ptjira Srisathitha qualified based on her performance at the 2018 Roller Speed Skating World Championship in Heerde, Netherlands.

Individual

Rowing

Thailand qualified one boat based on its performance at the 2018 Asian Youth Olympic Games Qualification Regatta.

 Girls' pair – 2 athletes

Sailing

Thailand qualified one boat based on its performance at the IKA Twin Tip Racing Asian Qualifier.

Girls

Shooting

Kanyakorn Hirunphoem qualified based on her performance at the 2017 Asian Championships.

Individual

Team

Sport climbing

Narada Disyabut qualified based on her performance at the 2017 World Youth Championship in Innsbruck, Austria.

Individual

Swimming

Girls

Table tennis

Jinnipa Sawettabut qualified based on her performance at the Asian Qualification Event in Greater Noida, India. Also Yanapong Panagitgun qualified based on her performance at the Road to Buenos Aires – Latin America in Asuncion, Paraguay.

Singles

Team

Taekwondo

Boy

Girls

Tennis

Singles

Doubles

Weightlifting

Thailad qualified boys and girls (4 athletes) to the tournament.

Boys

Girls

References

2018 in Thai sport
Nations at the 2018 Summer Youth Olympics
Thailand at the Youth Olympics